Dichostates quadripunctatus is a species of beetle in the family Cerambycidae. It was described by Chevrolat in 1855. It is known from Cameroon, the Ivory Coast, the Democratic Republic of the Congo, Sierra Leone, Nigeria, and Togo. It contains the varietas Dichostates quadripunctatus var. fulvomaculatus.

References

Crossotini
Beetles described in 1855